Bristol City Council is the local authority for Bristol, a unitary authority and ceremonial county in England. Until 1 April 1996 it was a non-metropolitan district in Avon. Since 2012 it has also had a directly elected mayor.

Because of the 2020 COVID-19 pandemic, elections for the Mayor of Bristol, Bristol City Council councillors, and the Avon and Somerset Police and Crime Commissioner were delayed from 2020 to May 2021, with post holders terms extended by a year and the following terms shortened by a year.

Political control
Since the first election to the council in 1973 following the reforms of the Local Government Act 1972, political control of the council has been held by the following parties:

Non-metropolitan district

Unitary authority

Leadership
Prior to 2012, political leadership was provided by the leader of the council. The leaders from 2005 to 2012 were:

In 2012 the council changed to having directly-elected mayors. The mayors since 2012 have been:

Current councillors

City result maps

By-election results

References

External links
Bristol City Council
Election results 1995–2006

 
Council elections in South West England
Elections in Bristol
Elections
Unitary authority elections in England
Council elections in Avon